The  Regina Maria Hospital in Cluj-Napoca  was opened in 2019.

It is owned and operated by the private Regina Maria Health Network and cost €18 million.  The building is on seven levels.  There are eight medical departments and six surgical specialties.  The network has 35,000 health insurance subscribers in Cluj. 

Medstor has provided 30 mobile module carts which are designed to help clinicians deliver treatment at the point of care. 

The hospital has a self-check-in service, the first of its kind in Romania. The software also gives online access to test results.

References

Hospitals in Romania
Buildings and structures in Cluj-Napoca
2019 establishments in Romania